is a national highway of Japan that traverses the prefecture of Akita in a southwest–northeast routing. It connects the city of Kitaakita in north-central Akita Prefecture and Yurihonjō on the prefecture's southwestern coast.

Route description

National Route 105 crosses Akita Prefecture in a southwest–northeast routing. Beginning at a junction with national routes 7 and 341 in the coastal city of Yurihonjō, it travels east alongside National Route 107 and National Route 108 through the central district of the city. After crossing over the Uetsu Main Line, the concurrent highways leave National Route 105, with National Route 108 exiting first, heading southwest towards Miyagi Prefecture. Shortly beyond that point, National Route 107 leaves continuing east towards Iwate Prefecture while National Route 105 turns to the north, paralleling the Uetsu Line. Eventually the highway curves to the east again, heading towards Daisen. Southwest of central Daisen, the highway turns to the north at a junction with the Akita Expressway. After passing through the city it enters the city of Semboku, though it passes to the west of the central district on its way towards Kitaakita. From the former village of Kakunodate in Semboku to the former town of Takanosu in Kitaakita, the highway is called the Matagi Road. From southern Semboku to Kitaakita, the highway roughly parallels the Akita Nairiku Line. The highway terminates at a junction with National Route 7 to the north of central Kitaakita.

Roadside Stations
The following Roadside Stations serve National Route 105:
Roadside Station Ōuchi, in the city of Yurihonjō
Roadside Station Nakasen, in the city of Daisen
Roadside Station Ani, in the city of Kitaakita

History
On 1 April 1963, the current National Route 105 was created when it was designated as Secondary National Route 105 between the cities of Ōmagari and Ōdate. The original Secondary National Route 105 was created on 18 May 1953, it is now designated as National Route 46. On 1 April 1965, Secondary National Route 105 was redesignated as General National Route 105. On 1 April 1970 the highway was extended south to Honjō (today's Yurihonjō) and north to Takanosu (today's Kitaakita). From 27 April to 30 June 2019, votes were cast to determine the name of a section of the highway between Kakunodate and Takanosu. On 8 November 2019, the government of Akita Prefecture announced the name chosen for the section of highway was "Matagi Road". The Matagi are a group of traditional winter hunters from the mountainous region of Akita Prefecture where the highway is located.

Major intersections
The route lies entirely within Akita Prefecture.

Auxiliary routes
Honjō–Ōmagari Road
Yonaizawa Bypass
Yokoiwa Bypass

See also

References

External links

105
Roads in Akita Prefecture